Oxford University College may refer to:

 University College, Oxford, collegiate research university located in Oxford, England
 Aletheia University, private university in Tamsui, Taiwan, formerly called the Oxford University College

See also 
 Oxford University (disambiguation)
 Oxford College (disambiguation)